opened on the shore of Lake Nojiri in Shinano, Nagano Prefecture, Japan, in 1984.

See also
 List of Historic Sites of Japan (Nagano)
 Nagano Prefectural Museum of History
 Japanese Paleolithic
 Heinrich Edmund Naumann

References

External links
  Lake Nojiri Naumann Elephant Museum

Museums in Nagano Prefecture
Natural history museums in Japan
Shinano, Nagano
Museums established in 1984
1984 establishments in Japan